The Clear Lake Fish Eaters were a minor league baseball team based in Clear Lake, Iowa. Clear Lake teams played as members of the Independent level Iowa State League in 1912 and the Class D level Central Association in 1917, with the 1917 team playing a brief season as the "Rabbits.". Both teams hosted home minor league games at the Clear Lake City Ball Park.

History
Clear Lake, Iowa first began minor league baseball play in 1912, when the Clear Lake Fish Eaters became members of the 1912 Iowa State League. The league had reformed as a five–team Independent League, playing a split–schedule. The Emmetsburg, Estherville, the Fort Dodge Boosters,  and Mason City Cementmakers teams joined Clear Lake in beginning league play on may 23, 1912. The Fish Eaters finished the with a record of 11–24 in the first–half standings, playing under managers Dick Wells and M. Bacon. Clear Lake played two games in the second–half before the franchise folded on July 12, 1914. The Iowa State League folded permanently after the 1914 season.

In 1917, Clear Lake resumed minor league play during the season. The Clear Lake Rabbits became members of the Class D level Central Association. On July 24, 1917, the Central Association member Cedar Rapids Rabbits moved to Clear Lake with a 38–48 record. Based in Clear Lake the team compiled a 1–4 record in finishing the remainder of the season. The Cedar Rapids/Clear Lake team ended the season with an overall record of 39–52. The Rabbits placed 4th in the Central Association standings, playing the season under managers Bill Collins, Doc Andrews and Doc Shanley.

The Central Association folded after the 1917 season. Clear Lake, Iowa has not hosted another minor league team.

The ballpark
Both Clear Lake teams played at Clear Lake City Ball Park. The ballpark was located within the City Park, located on the lakefront and near downtown. City Park is still in use today as a public park. The address of the ballpark was 1st Avenue North & North 3rd Street, Clear Lake, Iowa.

Timeline

Year-by-year records

Notable alumni
Bill Collins (1917)
Ray French (1917)
Walt Meinert (1917)
Doc Shanley (1917)

See also
Clear Lake Rabbits players

References

External links
Stats Crew

Defunct minor league baseball teams
Professional baseball teams in Iowa
Clear Lake, Iowa
Cerro Gordo County, Iowa
Central Association teams
Defunct baseball teams in Iowa
Baseball teams established in 1912
Baseball teams disestablished in 1912
1912 establishments in Iowa
1912 disestablishments in Iowa
Iowa State League teams